Höje River (Swedish: Höje å) is a river in Scania in southern Sweden. It is about 35 km long and flows from the Häckeberga lake in the Lund Municipality and empties into the Øresund.

References

Scania
Rivers of Skåne County